Hassan Mohammed Hassan Al-Omari (born 21 April 1994) is a Saudi Arabian footballer who plays as a winger for Saudi Arabian club Al-Taawoun.

Career

Youth 
Al-Omari started his career at Al-Qadsiah but left in 2014. On 14 January 2014, he joined derby rivals Al-Ettifaq on a three-year amateur contract. On 28 August 2014, Al-Omari returned to Al-Qadsiah, signing a five-year professional contract with the club.

Al-Qadsiah 
Al-Omari made his first-team debut for Al-Qadsiah on 17 October 2014, by coming off the bench in the league match against Al-Wehda. He made his first start on 23 February 2015 in the King Cup match against Al-Khaleej. On 17 October 2015, Al-Omari scored his first goal for the club in the 3–1 defeat to Al-Ittihad. On 27 August 2018, Al-Omari renewed his contract with the club for a further four years. He helped the club achieve promotion to the Pro League during the 2019–20 season making 31 league appearances and scoring 5 goals. 

On 17 October 2020, he started the 2020–21 season by scoring in the 2–1 defeat to Al-Wehda. He then scored in the 2–2 home draw against Al-Batin. He then scored twice in the 2–1 win against Al-Ain, followed by a late winner in the King Cup match against Al-Shabab. On 27 December 2020, he scored in the 2–1 derby loss against his former club Al-Ettifaq. On 2 January 2021, Al-Omari assisted Danilo Asprilla's stoppage-time equalizer in the 2–2 draw against Al-Raed. He followed this by scoring twice in the next two games against Al-Ahli and Al-Faisaly. He then assisted Khalifah Al-Dawsari's opener in the 1–1 draw against Al-Fateh. Al-Omari good form continued with him scoring four times and assisting twice in his next four games. On 23 February 2021, Al-Omari assisted Stanley Ohawuchi's opener in the eventual 2–2 draw against Al-Batin.

Al-Taawoun 
Following Al-Qadsiah's relegation, Al-Omari joined Al-Taawoun on a three-year contract on 8 August 2021.

Career statistics

Club

Honours
Al-Qadsiah
 MS League/First Division: 2014–15, runner-up 2019–20

References

External links
 
 

Living people
1994 births
People from Dhahran
Association football midfielders
Saudi Arabian footballers
Saudi Arabia youth international footballers
Al-Qadsiah FC players
Ettifaq FC players
Al-Taawoun FC players
Saudi Professional League players
Saudi First Division League players